The West Coast Eagles is a football club in the Australian Football League and AFL Women's. The club is based in Western Australia and has won the AFL premiership four times, in 1992, 1994, 2006 and 2018.

VFL/AFL
There have been fourteen players to hold the men's captaincy since the club commenced competition in 1987:

AFL Women's
The club entered the AFL Women's competition in 2020.

References

Notes 

1.  Kemp and Cousins were co-captains during the 2001 season.
2.  The West Coast captaincy was rotated in 2014 from round 13 on following the retirement of Darren Glass.

Captains
West Coast